Taesongsan Revolutionary Martyrs' Cemetery is a cemetery and memorial to the North Korean soldiers fighting for freedom and independence against Japanese rule. The 30-hectares site is located near the top of Mount Taesong (Taesongsan) in the Taesong-guyŏk, just outside Pyongyang, capital of North Korea.

The cemetery with hundreds of tombs was completed in 1975 and in October 1985 was renovated and expanded. Its design inspired the design of two African cemeteries, National Heroes Acre in Zimbabwe and Heroes' Acre in Namibia.

Description
The entrance to the cemetery is marked by a monumental gate in Korean style. Each of the graves is provided with a bronze bust. At the far end of the memorial there is a conspicuous red flag made of granite. Heo-nik Kwon & Byung-Ho Chung (2012) covered the cemetery in their publication North Korea: Beyond Charismatic Politics, noting the cemetery's significance in politics, where it can not only satisfy the North Korean need for revolutionary narratives, but also compensate for its flaw in large-scale absence of ordinary military cemeteries.

Notable people buried
 Kim Jong-suk, first wife of Kim Il-sung.
 Kang Pan-sŏk, mother of Kim Il-sung.
 Kim Ch'aek, general and politician.
 Nam Il, general and politician.
 Ri Yong-suk, politician.

See also
 Kumsusan Palace of the Sun
 Patriotic Martyrs' Cemetery
 Daejeon National Cemetery
 Seoul National Cemetery
 National Heroes Acre (Zimbabwe)
 Heroes' Acre (Namibia)

References

External links

 Revolutionary Martyrs Cemetery on Mt. Taesong (video) at Naenara
 

Pyongyang
Cemeteries in North Korea
1975 establishments in North Korea
20th-century architecture in North Korea